No Boundaries is the second album from the classical piano group The 5 Browns.

Critical reception

James Manheim of AllMusic writes, "U.S. marketers have been looking for a crossover blockbuster to match Britain's parade of chart-topping teens, and they may just have found one in this quintet of well-scrubbed Utah siblings (three girls, two boys) who won separate scholarships to the Juilliard School in New York. The best news is that the playing here is musically solid and the repertoire even a bit challenging"

Jed Distler of ClassicToday says, "These five brothers and sisters really can play!" and concludes his review with, "In all, this is an enjoyable disc, with something for everyone. But if the Browns seriously want to cultivate a 'No Boundaries' image, perhaps a programming and repertoire consultant can take them to the next level."

Track listing

References

The 5 Browns albums
2006 albums